Fautor richeri is a species of sea snail, a marine gastropod mollusk, in the family Calliostomatidae within the superfamily Trochoidea, the top snails, turban snails and their allies.

Description
The length of the shell attains 12.3 mm.

Distribution
This marine species occurs off New Caledonia.

References

Calliostomatidae
Gastropods described in 1995